Bruce Peppin (21 November 1924 – 11 May 2019)  was a British former speed skater who competed in the 1948 Winter Olympics.

References

1924 births
2019 deaths
British male speed skaters
Olympic speed skaters of Great Britain
Speed skaters at the 1948 Winter Olympics